The Herr's Mill Covered Bridge was a covered bridge that spans Pequea Creek in Lancaster County, Pennsylvania, United States. It is also sometimes known as Soudersburg Bridge.

The bridge had a double span, wooden, double Burr arch trusses design.  It was painted red on the outside, the traditional color of Lancaster County covered bridges.  Both approaches to the bridge were painted in the traditional white color.

The bridge's WGCB Number is 38-36-21.  In 1980 it was added to the National Register of Historic Places as structure number 80003537.  It was located at  (40.00983, -76.16217),  in Paradise Township on Ronks Road 0.4 km (0.25 mi) south of U.S. Route 30 to the east of Lancaster city.

History 
Herr's Mill Covered Bridge was built in 1844 by Joseph Elliot and Robert Russell at a cost of $1787.  It has a double-span, double-arch Burr arch truss construction.  In 1875, the bridge was rebuilt by James C. Carpenter at a cost of $1860.  The bridge was later bypassed by a new concrete bridge and is now on the  private property of the Mill Bridge Village Camping Resort. Owner Brian Kopan was quoted as saying "The bridge is in fine condition. We’re hoping to keep it as it is." In October 2018, the bridge was dismantled and was being moved to Elizabethtown, before it fell into the creek.

Dimensions 
Length: 178 feet (54.3 m) total length
Width: 15 feet (4.6 m) total width

Gallery

See also
Burr arch truss
List of Lancaster County covered bridges

References 

Covered bridges in Lancaster County, Pennsylvania
Covered bridges on the National Register of Historic Places in Pennsylvania
Bridges completed in 1844
National Register of Historic Places in Lancaster County, Pennsylvania
Road bridges on the National Register of Historic Places in Pennsylvania
Wooden bridges in Pennsylvania
Burr Truss bridges in the United States